This is a list of the French singles & airplay chart reviews number-ones of 1957.

Number-ones by week

Singles chart

See also
1957 in music
List of number-one hits (France)

References

Number-one singles
France
1957